Ecuadorian Segunda Categoría is the third division of the Ecuadorian Football Federation league system. The league is sometimes referred to as Copa Pilsener Segunda Categoría.

The Ecuadorian 3rd division was established in 1967.

List of champions

External links
 Ecuagol.com
 Futbol.ec
 Futbolizados.com, resúmenes y videos de Fútbol Ecuatoriano
 Federación Ecuatoriana de Fútbol
 Futbolecuador.com - Lo mejor del fútbol ecuatoriano, actualidad

3
Ecu